Evald Sikk (10 February 1910 – 8 August 1945) was an Estonian wrestler. He competed in the men's Greco-Roman bantamweight at the 1936 Summer Olympics. He was executed in a prison camp during World War II.

References

External links
 

1910 births
1945 deaths
Estonian male sport wrestlers
Olympic wrestlers of Estonia
Wrestlers at the 1936 Summer Olympics
Sportspeople from Võru
Estonian people executed by the Soviet Union
Estonian prisoners of war
20th-century Estonian people